Sticta parvilobata is a species of foliose lichen in the family Peltigeraceae. Found in Puerto Rico, it was formally described as a new species in 2020 by Joel Mercado‐Díaz and Robert Lücking. The lichen is only known to occur in high-elevation forests at this location as well as  the Toro Negro State Forest. The specific epithet parvilobata refers to the usually smaller lobes in mature specimens of this species, compared to its close relative Sticta ciliata.

References

parvilobata
Lichen species
Lichens described in 2020
Lichens of the Caribbean
Taxa named by Robert Lücking